Out of True is a 1951 British drama-documentary film, directed by Philip Leacock and starring Jane Hylton and Muriel Pavlow.  Out of True was made by the Crown Film Unit with sponsorship from the Ministry of Health, and was promoted as a "fictional account of a nervous breakdown which conforms to the pattern of much of the mental illness occurring today".  The film received a nomination in the category Best Documentary Film at the 1951 British Academy Film Awards.  Its production was motivated, in part, by the U.S. film Snake Pit, which some critics in the UK feared would cast all psychiatric hospitals in a negative light.

Plot
Molly Slade (Hylton) wakes up feeling extremely depressed.  She has run out of tea and goes to the local shop to buy some, but finds the shop still closed.  Pushed over the edge by this seemingly trivial inconvenience, she ends up attempting suicide by jumping from a bridge into the river but is saved in time.  Husband Arthur (David Evans) comes home from work to find that Molly has been committed to a psychiatric hospital.  Molly's treatment involves medication and electroconvulsive therapy.  While in hospital she befriends fellow patient Betty (Pavlow) and together they are seen in exercise classes, playing table tennis and receiving occupational therapy.  Molly leaves the hospital one night and goes home, but Arthur returns her to the hospital until she has completed her treatment and been officially released.  Finally, with her treatment concluded and her mind back on an even keel, Molly is able to return to her family.

Cast
 Jane Hylton as Molly Slade
 Muriel Pavlow as Betty
 David Evans as Arthur Slade
 Mary Merrall as Granny
 Beatrice Varley as Mrs. Green
 Robert Brown as Dr. Dale
 Jean Anderson as Dr. Bell

References

External links 
 

1951 films
1951 drama films
Films directed by Philip Leacock
British black-and-white films
Crown Film Unit films
British drama films
1950s English-language films
1950s British films